Pickens may refer to:

People 
 Pickens (surname)

Places in the United States of America 
 Pickens, Mississippi
 Pickens, Oklahoma
 Pickens, South Carolina
 Pickens, Texas
 Pickens, West Virginia
 Pickens County, Alabama
 Pickens County, Georgia
 Pickens County, South Carolina